Leptosia lignea, the Sulawesi wood white, is a butterfly of the family Pieridae, found on Sulawesi.

"M. de Rosenberg" is credited with finding the first specimens, which Samuel Constant Snellen van Vollenhoven then used to describe as a new species in 1865. 

Larvae feed on Capparis species.

References

External links
Vollenhoven, S. Essai d'une faune entomologique de l'archipel Indonéerlandais

lignea
Butterflies of Indonesia
Butterflies described in 1865
Taxa named by Samuel Constantinus Snellen van Vollenhoven